Nebria chasli is a species of ground beetle from Nebriinae subfamily that is endemic to Jiangxi province of China.

References

chasli
Beetles described in 1886
Beetles of Asia
Endemic fauna of China